Savannah Broadus (born September 18, 2002) is an American tennis player.

Career
Broadus has a career-high ITF junior combined ranking of 26, achieved on September 9, 2019. Broadus won the 2019 Wimbledon Championships – Girls' doubles title with Abigail Forbes.

Broadus won her first tournament on the ITF Women's Circuit in May 2019 in Williamsburg, partnering with fellow American Vanessa Ong.

ITF Circuit finals

Doubles: 2 (1 title, 1 runner-up)

Junior Grand Slam titles

Doubles: 1 (1 title)

References

External links
 
 

2002 births
Living people
American female tennis players
Wimbledon junior champions
Grand Slam (tennis) champions in girls' doubles
21st-century American women
Pepperdine Waves women's tennis players